Yevgeni Gennadyevich Davletshin (born 21 April 1972 in Sverdlovsk) is a former Russian football player.

References

1972 births
Sportspeople from Yekaterinburg
Living people
Soviet footballers
FC Ural Yekaterinburg players
Russian footballers
Russian Premier League players
FC Uralets Nizhny Tagil players

Association football midfielders